Morval may refer to:

 Morval, Cornwall, England
 , in the commune of Andelot-Morval, France
 Morval, Pas-de-Calais, France